Stellar chemistry is the study of the chemical composition of astronomical objects; stars in particular, hence the name stellar chemistry. The significance of stellar chemical composition is an open ended question at this point.  Some research asserts that a greater abundance of certain elements (such as carbon, sodium, silicon, and magnesium) in the stellar mass are necessary for a star's inner solar system to be habitable over long periods of time.  The hypothesis being that the "abundance of these elements make the star cooler and cause it to evolve more slowly, thereby giving planets in its habitable zone more time to develop life as we know it." Stellar abundance of oxygen also appears to be critical to the length of time newly developed planets exist in a habitable zone around their host star.  Researchers postulate that if our own sun had a lower abundance of oxygen, the Earth would have ceased to "live" in a habitable zone a billion years ago, long before complex organisms had the opportunity to evolve.

Other research
Other research is being or has been done in numerous areas relating to the chemical nature of stars.  The formation of stars is of particular interest.  Research published in 2009 presents spectroscopic observations of so-called "young stellar objects" viewed in the Large Magellanic Cloud with the Spitzer Space Telescope.  This research suggests that water, or, more specifically, ice, plays a large role in the formation of these eventual stars 

Others are researching much more tangible ideas relating to stars and chemistry.  Research published in 2010 studied the effects of a strong stellar flare on the atmospheric chemistry of an Earth-like planet orbiting an M dwarf star, specifically, the M dwarf AD Leonis.  This research simulated the effects an observed flare produced by AD Leonis on April 12, 1985 would have on a hypothetical Earth-like planet.  After simulating the effects of both UV radiation and protons on the hypothetical planet's atmosphere, the researchers concluded that "flares may not present a direct hazard for life on the surface of an orbiting habitable planet. Given that AD Leo[nis] is one of the most magnetically active M dwarfs known, this conclusion should apply to planets around other M dwarfs with lower levels of chromospheric activity."

See also
Abundance of the chemical elements
Astrochemistry
Cosmochemistry
Metallicity
Molecules in stars

References

Astrochemistry